Streptomyces demainii is a bacterium species from the genus of Streptomyces.

See also 
 List of Streptomyces species

References

Further reading

External links
Type strain of Streptomyces demainii at BacDive -  the Bacterial Diversity Metadatabase

demainii
Bacteria described in 2008